is a Japanese football player. He plays for Grulla Morioka.

Career
Ryoichi Kawazu joined J2 League club JEF United Chiba in 2015. In August, he moved to Azul Claro Numazu, where he stayed two and a half-years. In January 2018, he opted to sign for Grulla Morioka.

Club statistics
Updated to 22 February 2018.

References

External links

1992 births
Living people
Senshu University alumni
Association football people from Osaka Prefecture
Japanese footballers
J2 League players
J3 League players
Japan Football League players
JEF United Chiba players
Azul Claro Numazu players
Iwate Grulla Morioka players
Association football defenders